The 2016–17 Biathlon World Cup – Sprint Women started on Saturday 3 December 2016 in Östersund and finished on Friday 17 March 2017 in Oslo Holmenkollen. The defending titlist was Gabriela Koukalová of the Czech Republic.

The small crystal globe winner for the category was Gabriela Koukalová of the Czech Republic.

Competition format
The  sprint race is the third oldest biathlon event; the distance is skied over three laps. The biathlete shoots two times at any shooting lane, first prone, then standing, totalling 10 targets. Competitors' starts are staggered, normally by 30 seconds.

2015–16 Top 3 standings

Medal winners

Standings

References

Sprint Women